The 1996–97 Libyan Premier League was the 29th edition of the competition since its inception in 1963. The league featured 25 teams, split into two groups, one of 13 and another of 12. The top team in each of these groups went into a one-off playoff match to decide the championship.

Tahaddy won the league, defeating Mahalla 2–0 to secure their third title. They have not won the league since.

League table

Group A

Group B

Playoff
Played on August 8, 1997, at 28 March Stadium, Benghazi
Tahaddy 2–0 Mahalla

References
Libya – List of final tables (RSSSF)

Libyan Premier League seasons
1
Libya